A monoisotopic element is an element which has only a single stable isotope (nuclide). There are only 26 elements that have this property. A list is given in a following section.

Stability is experimentally defined for chemical elements, as there are a number of stable nuclides with atomic numbers over ~40 which are theoretically unstable, but apparently have half-lives so long that they have not been observed directly or indirectly (from measurement of products) to decay.

Monoisotopic elements are characterized, except in a single case, by odd numbers of protons (odd Z), and even numbers of neutrons. Because of the energy gain from nuclear pairing effects, the odd number of protons imparts instability to isotopes of an odd Z, which in heavier elements requires a completely paired set of neutrons to offset this tendency into stability. (The five stable nuclides with odd Z and odd neutron numbers are hydrogen-2, lithium-6, boron-10, nitrogen-14, and tantalum-180m1.)

The single mononuclidic exception to the odd Z rule is beryllium; its single stable, primordial isotope, beryllium-9, has 4 protons and 5 neutrons. This element is prevented from having a stable isotope with equal numbers of neutrons and protons (beryllium-8, with 4 of each) by its instability toward alpha decay, which is favored due to the extremely tight binding of helium-4 nuclei. It is prevented from having a stable isotope with 4 protons and 6 neutrons by the very large mismatch in proton/neutron ratio for such a light element. (Nevertheless, beryllium-10 has a half-life of 1.36 million years, which is too short to be primordial, but still indicates unusual stability for a light isotope with such an imbalance.)

Differentiation from mononuclidic elements 

The set of monoisotopic elements overlap but are not the same as the set of 21 mononuclidic elements, which are characterized as having essentially only one isotope (nuclide) found in nature. The reason for this is the occurrence of certain long-lived radioactive primordial nuclides in nature, which may form admixtures with the monoisotopics, and thus prevent them from being naturally mononuclidic. This happens in the cases of 7 of the monoisotopic elements. These isotopes are monoisotopic, but due to the presence of the long-lived radioactive primordial nuclide, are not mononuclidic. These elements are vanadium, rubidium, indium, lanthanum, europium, lutetium and rhenium. See the list below; in two noted cases (indium and rhenium), the long-lived radionuclide is actually the most abundant isotope in nature, and the stable isotope is less abundant. 

In 2 additional cases (bismuth and protactinium), mononuclidic elements occur primordially which are not monoisotopic because the naturally occurring nuclide is radioactive, and thus the element has no stable isotopes at all. For an element to be monoisotopic, it must have one stable nuclide.

List of (observationally-stable) monoisotopic elements, ordered by atomic number and weight 

Non-mononuclidic elements are marked with an asterisk, and the long-lived primordial radioisotope given. In two notable cases (indium and rhenium), the most abundant naturally occurring isotope is the mildly radioactive one, and in the case of europium, nearly half of it is.

 Beryllium-9
 Fluorine-19
 Sodium-23
 Aluminium-27
 Phosphorus-31
 Scandium-45
 Vanadium-51* naturally occurs with 0.25% of radioactive vanadium-50
 Manganese-55
 Cobalt-59
 Arsenic-75
 Rubidium-85* naturally occurs with 27.835% of radioactive rubidium-87
 Yttrium-89
 Niobium-93
 Rhodium-103
 Indium-113* naturally occurs with majority (95.7%) radioactive isotope indium-115
 Iodine-127
 Caesium-133
 Lanthanum-139* naturally occurs with 0.09% radioactive lanthanum-138
 Praseodymium-141
 Europium-153* naturally occurs with 47.8% radioactive europium-151
 Terbium-159
 Holmium-165
 Thulium-169
 Lutetium-175* naturally occurs with 2.59% radioactive lutetium-176
 Rhenium-185* naturally occurs with majority (62.6%) radioactive isotope rhenium-187
 Gold-197

See also 

 Primordial nuclide
 List of nuclides (sorted by half-life)
 Table of nuclides
 Isotope geochemistry
 Radionuclide
 Mononuclidic element
 Stable isotope
 List of elements by stability of isotopes

References

External links 
 Atomic Weights of the Elements as of year 2000, with a section on monoisotopics starting page 708

Isotopes
Sets of chemical elements
Metrology